Over Christmas is a 2020 German television miniseries starring Luke Mockridge, Seyneb Saleh and Cristina do Rego.

Cast
 Luke Mockridge as Bastian, an aspiring musician who works at a call center
 Seyneb Saleh as Karina, Bastian's new love interest
 Cristina do Rego as Fine, Bastian's ex-girlfriend, now in a relationship with Niklas
 Lucas Reiber as Niklas, Bastian's brother
 Johanna Gastdorf as Brigitte, the mother of Bastian and Niklas
 Rudolf Kowalski as Walter, the father of Bastian and Niklas
 Carmen-Maja Antoni as Oma Hilde, the grandmother of Bastian and Niklas
 Jonathan Kwesi Aikins as Hagen
 Eugen Bauder as Ingo
 Eike Weinreich as Carsten

Episodes

See also
 Merry Happy Whatever

References

External links
 
 

2020 German television series debuts
2020 German television series endings
2020s German comedy television series
German-language Netflix original programming
Christmas television series